The following highways are numbered 881:

United States